Midrasha Zionit is an international Jewish community founded in 2001. The organization was founded by the Advisor to the Israeli Minister for Absorption Shlomo Neeman. The head office is in Jerusalem.

Activity 
The international Jewish community of Russian-speaking Jews was born in Kyiv in 2001 as a small community education project and has developed into a strong independent organization with its center in Jerusalem. Midrasha Zionit popularizes values of Religious Zionism and the Modern Orthodox Judaism. Midrasha Zionit holds summer and winter youth educational camps "Thelet", seminars and Shabbathones in Israel, CIS, Georgia, Baltic States and United States of America. Midrasha Zionit has its own training Madrich’s (teachers) school and school of leaders of informal Jewish education "Hilazon". Midrasha Zionit is located in Kyiv's Galitska Synagogue where it leads the community and educational activity. Activity with in cooperation with the "Ohr Torah Stone" led by Rabbi Shlomo Riskin.

History 
The organization was born in Kyiv as a small community project and during this period of time it developed in a strong and independent organization with the center in Jerusalem. Its own style and the pedagogical view appeared the same as the students from CIS and from Israel. In Israel, where the great number of participants and teachers made aliyah, they go to army, study at the universities, teach in the schools and build the community settlements.

Goals 
Involving to the culture and religion of Israel at a high intellectual level, Torah studying. Holding the summer and winter youth educational camps "Thelet", seminars and Shabbathones in Israel, CIS, Georgia, Baltic States and United States of America. Has its own training Madrich’s (teachers) school and school of leaders of informal Jewish education "Hilazon".

External links 
 
 Official channel on YouTube
 Official page in social network Facebook
 Midrasha Zionit – Educational Seminars in Israel

2001 establishments in Ukraine
Jewish educational organizations
Jewish organizations based in Israel
Jewish organizations established in 2001
Jews and Judaism in Kyiv
Modern Orthodox Judaism in Israel
Modern Orthodox Judaism in Europe
Organizations based in Jerusalem
Orthodox Judaism in Jerusalem
Orthodox Judaism in Ukraine
Religious Zionist organizations
Russian-Jewish culture in Israel
Russian-Ukrainian culture
Ukrainian-Jewish culture in Israel
Zionism in Ukraine